Nedd is a small village, which lies on the western head of  Loch Nedd in Lairg, western Sutherland, Scottish Highlands and is in the Scottish council area of Highland.

The village of Drumbeg lies less than 1 mile north west along the B869 road.

Murdoch Grant, a famous victim of murder, was killed close to Nedd. The financier John Stewart was born in Nedd.

References

Populated places in Sutherland